Charles Somerset, 1st Earl of Worcester, KG (c. 146015 March 1526) was an English nobleman and politician. He was the legitimised bastard son of Henry Beaufort, 3rd Duke of Somerset by his mistress Joan Hill.

Origins
He was born in about 1460, an illegitimate son of Henry Beaufort, 3rd Duke of Somerset by his mistress Joan Hill.

Career
He was invested as a Knight of the Garter in about 1496. On his marriage in 1492 he was styled Baron Herbert in right of his wife, and in 1506 he was created Baron Herbert of Ragland, Chepstow and Gower. On 1 February 1514, he was created Earl of Worcester and was at some time appointed Lord Chamberlain of the Household to King Henry VIII. As Lord Chamberlain, Somerset was largely responsible for the preparations for the Field of Cloth of Gold in 1520.

Marriages and children
He married three times, although his second marriage is uncertain:
Firstly on 2 June 1492, to Elizabeth Herbert, 3rd Baroness Herbert (died before March 1513), daughter of William Herbert, 2nd Earl of Pembroke, 2nd Baron Herbert, in right of whom he was created Lord Herbert. By Elizabeth Herbert he had the following children:
Henry Somerset, 2nd Earl of Worcester, only son and heir
Elizabeth Somerset, his only daughter, wife successively of Sir John Savage and Sir William Brereton.
Secondly to Elizabeth West, daughter of Sir Thomas West, 8th Baron De La Warr. His supposed marriage to Elizabeth West, however, may be an error made by Dugdale, repeated by later writers. By Elizabeth West he supposedly had the following children:
Sir Charles Somerset
Sir George Somerset
Lady Mary Somerset of Worcester, wife successively of William Grey, 13th Baron Grey de Wilton and of Robert Carre.
Thirdly to Eleanor Sutton, daughter of Edward Sutton, 2nd Lord Dudley.

Death and burial
Somerset died on 15 March 1526 and was buried with his first wife at St George's Chapel, Windsor Castle.

Coat of Arms

Family tree

Notes

References
 Burke, John, Burke's genealogical and heraldic history of peerage, baronetage and knightage, G.P.Putnam's Sons:New York, 1914.
 Gurney, E. Henry, Reference handbook for readers, students, and teachers of English history , Ginn & Company:Boston, 1890.
 McClain, Molly, Beaufort: the duke and his duchess, 1657-1715, Yale University Press, 2001.

1460s births
1526 deaths
Ambassadors of England to France
Knights of the Garter
01
03
15th-century English people
16th-century English nobility
Herbert, 1st Baron, Charles Somerset
C